Brian Bowles may refer to:

Brian Bowles (fighter) (born 1980), American mixed martial artist
Brian Bowles (baseball) (born 1976), former Major League Baseball relief pitcher
Brian Bowles (ice hockey) in 1975–76 Cleveland Crusaders season
Brian Bowles (voice actor) in Simon the Sorcerer series